is the 19th studio album by Japanese singer/songwriter Mari Hamada, released on March 21, 2007 by Meldac/Tokuma Japan. The album marked the return of musicians Michael Landau and Leland Sklar.

Sur Lie peaked at No. 93 on Oricon's albums chart.

Track listing

Charts

Personnel 
 Michael Landau – guitar
 Hiroyuki Ohtsuki – guitar, bass
 Takashi Masuzaki – guitar
 Leland Sklar – bass
 Kaoru Ohori – bass
 Yūichi Matsuzaki – keyboards
 Takanobu Masuda – keyboards
 Gregg Bissonette – drums
 Hirotsugu Homma – drums

References

External links 
  (Mari Hamada)
 Official website (Tokuma Japan)
 
 

2007 albums
Japanese-language albums
Mari Hamada albums
Tokuma Shoten albums